Habashi may refer to:
 Habesha people, ethnic term for people of Abyssinia or Ethiopia or aritri
 Siddi or Habshi, an ethnic group in South Asia of African origin
 Habashi, Ardabil
 Habashi, Hamadan
 Habashi, Kermanshah
 Habashi, West Azerbaijan

See also

Binyam Mohammed al-Habashi, former Guantanamo Bay detainee